Jennifer Slept Here is an American fantasy sitcom television series that ran for one season on NBC from October 21, 1983, to September 5, 1984. The series was a Larry Larry production in association with Columbia Pictures Television.

Overview 

In the series, Ann Jillian plays Jennifer Farrell, a once-popular movie actress who in 1978 made the unfortunate mistake of chasing an ice cream truck near her Los Angeles, California home. When the ice cream truck accidentally backed up, it ran her over, killing her.  Six years later, the Elliot family moved from New York City into Jennifer's home.  Father George was a lawyer who had handled Jennifer's posthumous affairs, including the house. George's wife, Susan, was a concerned and understanding figure. Daughter Marilyn was a typical 8-year-old.

The driving story behind the series was that Jennifer haunted the Elliot house—ostensibly to mentor and befriend the family's teenage son, Joey, who was the only person to whom she made herself visible.  During the series, however, she does make herself visible in at least one episode.  Naturally, Joey had a hard time convincing his family and friends of Jennifer's ghostly existence.  They not only refused to believe Joey's claim, but often concluded Joey needed psychiatric or other help.  In one episode, they hired a phony exorcist (played by Zelda Rubinstein in a parody of her Poltergeist character Tangina Barrons) to rid the house of Jennifer's spirit by capturing it in a jar.

Cast 

 Ann Jillian as Jennifer Farrell
 John P. Navin Jr. as Joseph "Joey" Elliot
 Georgia Engel as Susan Elliot
 Brandon Maggart as George Elliot
 Mya Akerling as Marilyn Elliot
 Glenn Scarpelli as Marc

Theme song 

The series theme song, also titled "Jennifer Slept Here", was written by Joey Murcia, Bill Payne, Clint Holmes, and series star Ann Jillian, and was performed by recording artist Joey Scarbury.

Episodes

Reception

Critical response 
Although the show had mixed reviews and a tough Friday night time-slot (its competition was The Dukes of Hazzard on CBS and Webster on ABC), it attracted somewhat decent ratings. Repeats which were shown on Wednesday nights during the summer of 1984 often managed to make the Top 30, but that was not enough to guarantee a second season. Tom Ensign of The Toledo Blade, reviewing Jennifer Slept Here, stated that the show "isn't funny, it isn't witty and it doesn't stand the ghost of a chance". Baird Searles dismissed the series as "a shameless re-echo of Topper".

Ratings

Awards and nominations

References

External links 

 

1983 American television series debuts
1984 American television series endings
1980s American sitcoms
English-language television shows
American fantasy television series
Television series about ghosts
NBC original programming
Television series by Sony Pictures Television
Television shows set in Los Angeles
Fantasy comedy television series
American supernatural television series